The Empire 8 (E8) is an intercollegiate athletic conference affiliated with the NCAA’s Division III. The E8 sponsors intercollegiate athletic competition in men's baseball, men's and women's basketball, men's and women's cross country, women's field hockey, men's football, men's golf, men's and women's lacrosse, men's and women’s soccer, women's softball, men's and women's swimming and diving, men's and women's tennis, men's and women's track and field, and women's volleyball.

While men's volleyball is listed on the E8 website as a sponsored sport, the conference does not directly sponsor the sport. All E8 men's volleyball teams compete in the United Volleyball Conference, a separate league that shares offices with the E8.

Basketball
Alfred University, Elmira College, Hartwick College, Ithaca College, Nazareth College, Rochester Institute of Technology, St. John Fisher College, Stevens Institute of Technology, and Utica College compete in Empire 8 basketball. Both the men's and women's basketball championships were first held in 2002.

Men's

Champions
2002: Ithaca College
2003: St. John Fisher College
2004: St. John Fisher College
2005: St. John Fisher College
2006: St. John Fisher College
2007: St. John Fisher College
2008: Nazareth College
2011: Hartwick College

Player of the year
2000: Pat Britton (Ithaca)
2001: Devon Downing (Alfred), Brandon Redmond (RIT)
2002: Brandon Redmond (RIT)
2003: Jim Evans (Nazareth)
2004: Tyler Schulz (Ithaca)
2005: James "Big Game" Watkins (Hartwick College) 
2006: Matthew Simoneschi (Hartwick College)
2007: Matthew Simoneschi (Hartwick College)
2008: Matthew Simoneschi (Hartwick College)
2009: Sean Burton (Ithaca)

Rookie of the year
2000: DeWaun Cheatham (Utica)
2001: David Orr (Hartwick)
2002: Jeff Sidney (St. John Fisher)
2003: Fran Snyder (RIT)
2004: Dillon Stein (Alfred)
2005: Matthew Simoneschi(Hartwick)
2006: Jan Cocozziello (Hartwick)
2007: Corey McAdam (Nazareth)
2008: Shane Foster (RIT), Ozell Franklin (St. John Fisher)
2009: Mark Blazek (Hartwick)

Coach of the year
2000: Bob McVean (RIT)
2001: Jay Murphy (Alfred)
2002: Jim Mullins (Ithaca)
2003: Rob Kornaker (St. John Fisher)
2004: Rob Kornaker (St. John Fisher)
2005: Rob Kornaker (St. John Fisher)
2006: Andy Goodemote (Utica), Rob Kornaker (St. John Fisher)
2007: Rob Kornaker (St. John Fisher)
2008: Jim Mullins (Ithaca)
2009: Jim Mullins (Ithaca)

Women's

Champions
2002: Ithaca College
2003: St. John Fisher College
2004: Ithaca College
2005: Ithaca College
2006: St. John Fisher College
2007: Ithaca College
2008: Utica College
2009: Stevens Institute of Technology

Player of the year
2000: Amanda Waloven (St. John Fisher)
2001: Tiffany Hurley (Hartwick)
2002: Tiffany Hurley (Hartwick)
2003: Kerri Brown (Ithaca)
2004: Jennifer Parker (Elmira)
2005: Stephanie Cleary (Ithaca)
2006: Melissa Hartman (St. John Fisher)
2007: Ava Thomas (Utica)
2008: Dani Dudek (Stevens)
2009: Dani Dudek (Stevens)

Rookie of the year
2000: Roxanne Simpson (Utica)
2001: Jennie Swatling (Ithaca)
2002: Kadi Burgess (Nazareth)
2003: Jennifer Parker (Elmira)
2004: Lindsay Wilson (Hartwick)
2005: Kourtney Troutman (Elmira)
2006: Whitney Frament (Utica)
2007: Whitney Smith (Nazareth)
2008: Jessica Berry (Utica)
2009: Sharon Dennis (RIT)

Coach of the year
2000: Jennifer Kroll (Ithaca)
2001: Dan Raymond (Ithaca), Laura Hungerford (RIT)
2002: Dan Raymond (Ithaca)
2003: Michele Davis (Utica)
2004: Daphne Thompson (Hartwick)
2005: Dan Raymond (Ithaca)
2006: Matt Donohue (Elmira)
2007: Deb Buff (RIT)
2008: Jon Hochberg (Stevens)
2009: Dan Raymond (Ithaca)

Football
Alfred University, Hartwick College, Ithaca College, St. John Fisher College, Frostburg State University, Salisbury University, Buffalo State University and Utica College compete in Empire 8 football as of 2011 season. The men's football championship was first held in 2002.

Champions
2002: Ithaca College
2003: Ithaca College
2004: Ithaca College, St. John Fisher College
2005: Ithaca College
2006: Springfield College, St. John Fisher College
2007: Hartwick College, St. John Fisher College
2008: Ithaca College
2009: Alfred University, St. John Fisher College
2010: Alfred University
2011: Salisbury University
2012: Salisbury University
2013: Ithaca College
2015: SUNY Cortland 
2016: Alfred University (Goon Squad)

Player of the Year
2002: Dan Pincelli (Hartwick)
2003: Jesse Raynor (Alfred)
2004: Brenton Brady (Alfred)
2005: Josh Felicetti (Ithaca)
The Player of the Year award was discontinued in favor of Offensive and Defensive Player of the Year Awards in 2006.

Offensive Player of the Year
2006: Chris Sharpe (Springfield)
2007: Jason Boltus (Hartwick)
2008: Jason Boltus (Hartwick)
2009: Jared Manzer (Alfred)
2010: Tim Bailey (St. John Fisher)
2011: Dan Griffin (Salisbury)
2012: Andrew Benkwitt (Utica)

Defensive Player of the Year
2006: Gene Lang (St. John Fisher)
2007: Steve Stepnick (St. John Fisher)
2008: Matt Scalice (Ithaca)
2009: Andy Episcopo (St. John Fisher)
2010: Nick Clark (Alfred)
2011: Nick Clark (Alfred)
2012: Mike Raplee (Alfred)

Rookie of the year
2002: Josh Fellicetti (Ithaca)
2003: Aaron Meyers (Alfred)
2004: Jamie Donovan (Ithaca)
2005: Jason Boltus (Hartwick)
2006: Jared Manzer (Alfred)
2007: Jason Springer (Norwich)
2008: Tom Secky (Alfred)
2009: Andrew Benkwitt (Utica)
2010: Austin Dwyer (Alfred)
2011: J.D. Hook (Frostburg)
2012: Maleke Fuentes (Alfred)

Coach of the Year
2002: Paul Vosburgh (St. John Fisher)
2003: Mike Welch (Ithaca)
2004: Paul Vosburgh (St. John Fisher)
2005: Dave Murray (Alfred)
2006: Mike DeLong (Springfield)
2007: Mark Carr (Hartwick)
2008: Mike Welch (Ithaca)
2009: Dave Murray (Alfred)
2010: Dave Murray (Alfred)
2011: Sherman Wood (Salisbury)
2012: Sherman Wood (Salisbury)

Golf
Elmira College, Hartwick College, Nazareth College, St. John Fisher College and Utica College compete in Empire 8 golf. The men's golf championship was first held in 2001.

Champions
2001: St. John Fisher College
2002: Nazareth College
2003: Nazareth College
2004: St. John Fisher College
2005: St. John Fisher College
2006: St. John Fisher College
2007: St. John Fisher College
2008: St. John Fisher College

Player of the year
2001: Nicklaus Ambrose (Nazareth)
2002: Jason Baker (St. John Fisher)
2003: Brian Seeley (Nazareth)
2004: Mike Stackus (St. John Fisher)
2005: Zach Fuller (St. John Fisher)
2006:
2007: Scott Harris (St. John Fisher)
2008: Scott Harris (St. John Fisher)

Rookie of the year
2002: Kevin Kaye (Nazareth)
2003: Derrick Wong (St. John Fisher)
2004: Scott McNeil (Utica)
2005: Dave McKenna (Elmira)
2006:
2007: Tom Muto (St. John Fisher)
2008: Ben Herrmann (Nazareth)

Coach of the year
2002: Marty Coddington (Nazareth)
2003: Not Awarded
2004: Bob Simms (St. John Fisher)
2005: Bob Simms (St. John Fisher)
2006:
2007: Marty Coddington (Nazareth)
2008: Marty Coddington (Nazareth), Bob Simms (St. John Fisher)

Soccer
Alfred University, Elmira College, Ithaca College, Nazareth College, Rochester Institute of Technology, St. John Fisher College, Stevens Institute of Technology, and Utica College compete in Empire 8 men's soccer. The same schools with the addition of Hartwick College compete in Empire 8 women's soccer. The men's and women's soccer championships were first held in 2001.

Men's

Champions
2001: Alfred University, Rochester Institute of Technology
2002: Ithaca College
2003: Alfred University, Nazareth College
2004: Rochester Institute of Technology
2005: Nazareth College, Rochester Institute of Technology
2006: Nazareth College
2007: Stevens Institute of Technology
2008: Stevens Institute of Technology
2009: Stevens Institute of Technology
2010: Stevens Institute of Technology
2011: Stevens Institute of Technology
2012: Stevens Institute of Technology
2013: Stevens Institute of Technology

Player of the Year
1999: Steve Fisher (Nazareth)
2000: Steve Fisher (Nazareth)
2001: Cody Ostrum (RIT)
2002: Brian Lenzo (RIT)
2003: Jefferson Dargout (Nazareth)
2004: Mike Lawson (RIT)
2005: Mike Lawson (RIT)
2007: Luke Lennox (St. John Fisher)
2008: Terrence "T-Baby" Johnson (Stevens)
2009: Nolan "Batigol" Sandberg (Stevens)
2010: Nolan "Batigol" Sandberg (Stevens)
2011: Ryan Giggs (Stevens)
2012: Paul Scholes (Stevens)
2012: 1rep (Stevens)

The Player of the Year award was suspended in 2006 in favor of Offensive and Defensive Player of the Year Awards. The award was reinstated in 2007 for men's soccer only.

Offensive Player of the Year
2006: Kurt Odenbach (Ithaca)

Defensive Player of the Year
2006: Mohammed Ahamed (Nazareth)

Rookie of the Year
1999: Keith McManus (Elmira)
2000: Trae Lower (RIT)
2001: Ben Visnyei (Ithaca)
2002: Mike Lawson (RIT)
2003: Bobby Linaberry (Alfred)
2004: Adam Blanchard (St. John Fisher)
2005: Eric Ferguson (Ithaca), Chris Somers (RIT)
2006: Andrew Canterbury (Elmira)
2007: Andrew McIntosh (St. John Fisher)
2008: Andy Alaimo (Nazareth)

Doug May Memorial Coach of the Year
1999: Keith McManus (Nazareth)
2000: Bill Garno (RIT)
2001: Ken Hassler (Alfred)
2002: Andy Byrne (Ithaca)
2003: Ken Hassler (Alfred)
2004: Andy Byrne (Ithaca)
2005: Andy Byrne (Ithaca)
2006: Bill Garno (RIT)
2007: Steve Christenson (Utica)
2008: Andy Byrne (Ithaca)

Women's

Champions
2001: Nazareth College
2002: Ithaca College, Nazareth College
2003: Ithaca College, Nazareth College
2004: Ithaca College, Nazareth College
2005: Ithaca College, Nazareth College
2006: Nazareth College
2007: Ithaca College
2008: Ithaca College

Player of the Year
1999: Michelle Urbanski (Nazareth)
2000: Erin DeMarco (Ithaca)
2001: Jaime Snyder (Nazareth)
2002: Heidi Brown (Nazareth)
2003: Katie Allardice (Elmira)
2004: Kristina Cristofori (Nazareth)
2005: Ashley Williams (Ithaca)
The Player of the Year award was discontinued in favor of Offensive and Defensive Player of the Year Awards in 2006.

Offensive Player of the Year
2006: Chelsey Feldman (Ithaca)
2007: Chelsey Feldman (Ithaca)
2008: Amy Scheffer (Ithaca)

Defensive Player of the Year
2006: Ashley Williams (Ithaca)
2007: Nikki Rice (Ithaca)
2008: Salme Cook (Stevens)

Rookie of the Year
1999: Stephanie Nardini (Nazareth)
2000: Becca Berry (Ithaca)
2001: Rachel Thau (Ithaca)
2002: Jennifer Tuttle (Elmira)
2003: Ashley Baker (Utica)
2004: Becca Malinowski (Hartwick)
2005: Chelsey Feldman (Ithaca)
2006: Danielle Smith (Utica)
2007: Erica Conte (Nazareth)
2008: Kaylee Benz (Nazareth)

Coach of the Year
1999: Gail Mann (Nazareth), Kate Stoehr (Utica)
2000: Tom Natalie (RIT)
2001: Jill McCabe (St. John Fisher)
2002: Franco Bari (Elmira)
2003: Jessica Critchlow (Utica)
2004: Mindy Quigg (Ithaca)
2005: Jill McCabe (St. John Fisher)
2006: Tom Natalie (RIT)
2007: Mindy Quigg (Ithaca)
2008: Mindy Quigg (Ithaca)

Volleyball
Alfred University, Elmira College, Hartwick College, Ithaca College, Nazareth College, Rochester Institute of Technology, St. John Fisher College, Stevens Institute of Technology, and Utica College compete in Empire 8 volleyball. The women's volleyball championship was first held in 2001.

Champions
2001: Nazareth College
2002: Nazareth College
2003: Nazareth College
2004: Ithaca College
2005: Ithaca College
2006: Nazareth College
2007: Stevens Institute of Technology
2008: Stevens Institute of Technology

Player of the Year
2000: Leah Malliris (Elmira)
2001: Christa Downey (Nazareth)
2002: Christa Downey (Nazareth)
2003: Tricia Jones (Nazareth)
2004: Tricia Jones (Nazareth)
2005: Christina Anabel (RIT)
2006: Amanda Hubbard (Ithaca)
2007: Melissa Rhode (Stevens)
2008: Melanie Volk (Stevens)

Libero/Defensive Player of the Year
2006: Mary Schaefer (Ithaca)
2007: Jenna Waldron (St. John Fisher)
2008: Mallory Clary (Nazareth)

Rookie of the Year
2000: Not Awarded
2001: Sarah Ballard (RIT), Lori Wilkinson (St. John Fisher)
2002: Chris Anabel (RIT)
2003: Colleen Kiser (St. John Fisher)
2004: Katie Hause (Ithaca)
2005: Alyssa Ziobrowski (St. John Fisher)
2006: Corinna Doctor (Ithaca)
2007: Christina Evans (Hartwick)
2008: Audrey Zimmerman (Nazareth)

Coach of the Year
2000: Rhonda Faunce (Elmira)
2001: Linda Downey (Nazareth)
2002: Linda Downey (Nazareth)
2003: Roger Worsley (RIT)
2004: Janet Donovan (Ithaca)
2005: Jim Chan (St. John Fisher)
2006: Cal Wickens (Nazareth)
2007: J.J. O'Connell (Stevens)
2008: J.J. O'Connell (Stevens)

Baseball
Hartwick College, Ithaca College, Rochester Institute of Technology, St. John Fisher College and Utica College compete in Empire 8 baseball. The baseball championship was first held in 2002.

Champions
2002: Ithaca College
2003: Ithaca College
2004: Ithaca College
2005: Ithaca College
2006: Ithaca College
2007: Ithaca College
2008: Ithaca College

Player of the Year
2002: Geoff Osborne (St. John Fisher)
2003: Kyle Wilkins (Ithaca)
2004: Andy Campbell (St. John Fisher)
2005: Andy Campbell (St. John Fisher)
2006: Matt Fuller (St. John Fisher)
2007: Geoff Dornes (RIT)
2008: Geoff Dornes (RIT)

Rookie of the Year
2002: Nick Bergman (St. John Fisher)
2003: Andy Campbell (St. John Fisher)
2004: Chris Botsford (St. John Fisher)
2005: Rob Raux (Ithaca)
2006: Drew Ash (Ithaca)
2007: Geoff Dornes (RIT)
2008: David Ahonen (Ithaca)

Pitcher of the Year
2007: Dylan Rees (RIT)
2008: Bryan Gardner (Ithaca)

Coach of the Year
2002: Barry Shelton (Hartwick), George Valesente (Ithaca)
2003: George Valesente (Ithaca)
2004: George Valesente (Ithaca)
2005: George Valesente (Ithaca)
2006: George Valensente (Ithaca)
2007: Dan Pepicelli (St. John Fisher)
2008: George Valesente (Ithaca), Rob Grow (RIT)

Softball
Alfred University, Elmira College, Hartwick College, Ithaca College, Rochester Institute of Technology, St. John Fisher College and Utica College compete in Empire 8 softball. The women's softball championship was first held in 2002.

Champions
2002: Ithaca College
2003: Ithaca College
2004: Ithaca College
2005: Ithaca College
2006: Ithaca College
2007: Ithaca College
2008: St. John Fisher College
2009: St. John Fisher College

Player of the Year
2000: Robin Bimson (Ithaca)
2001: Laura Remia (Ithaca)
2002: Shari McNamara (RIT)
2003: Shari McNamara (RIT)
2004: Zahida Sherman (Ithaca)
2005: Leigh Bonkowski (Ithaca)
2006: Kaitlyn Dulac (Ithaca)
2007: Hannah Shalett (Ithaca)
2008: Erica Cutspec (Ithaca), Sara Dresser (St. John Fisher)

Pitcher of the Year
2007: Nicole Cade (Ithaca)
2008: Carly Myers (Ithaca)

Rookie of the Year
2000: Amanda Kent (St. John Fisher)
2001: Shari McNamara (RIT)
2002: Abby Pelot (Ithaca)
2003: Leigh Bonkowski (Ithaca)
2004: Zahida Sherman (Ithaca)
2005: Carly Myers (Ithaca)
2006: Ashlee McBride-Krause (St. John Fisher)
2007: Sarah Gates (St. John Fisher)
2008: Emily McPherson (RIT)

Coach of the Year
2000: Deb Pallozzi (Ithaca)
2001: Jack Carpenter (RIT), Deb Pallozzi (Ithaca)
2002: Jack Carpenter (RIT), Deb Pallozzi (Ithaca)
2003: Deb Pallozzi (Ithaca)
2004: Len Maiorani (St. John Fisher)
2005: Jack Carpenter (RIT)
2006: Pat Mineo (Utica)
2007: Deb Pallozzi (Ithaca)
2008: Gino Olivieri (Alfred)

Field hockey
Elmira College, Hartwick College, Ithaca College, Nazareth College, Stevens Institute of Technology, Utica College, and Washington & Jefferson College compete in Empire 8 field hockey. The women's field hockey championship was first held in 2002.

Champions
2002: Hartwick College
2003: Ithaca College
2004: Hartwick College
2005: Hartwick College
2006: Ithaca College, Utica College
2007: Nazareth College
2008: Stevens Institute of Technology

Player of the Year
2002: Tara Wilkes (Hartwick)
2003: Tara Wilkes (Hartwick)
2004: Kelly Cooman (Hartwick)
2005: Tasha Snowden (Ithaca)
2006: Katie Kutas (Utica)
2007: Kelly Miranda (Nazareth)
2008:

Rookie of the Year
2002: Natasha Snowden (Ithaca)
2003: Riana Bovill (Elmira)
2004: Danielle Fiore (Utica)
2005: Katie Kutas (Utica)
2006: Courtney Geddis (Stevens)
2007: Lauren Griggs (Stevens)
2008:

Coach of the Year
2002: Bern Macca (Elmira)
2003: Bern Macca (Elmira), Pat Mihalko (Utica)
2004: Anna Meyer (Hartwick)
2005: Megan McGuin (Utica)
2006: Jessica Reed (Stevens)
2007: Jomara Coghlan (Washington & Jefferson)
2008:

Lacrosse
Alfred University, Elmira College, Hartwick College, Ithaca College, Nazareth College, Rochester Institute of Technology, St. John Fisher College, Stevens Institute of Technology, and Utica College compete in Empire 8 lacrosse. The men's and women's lacrosse championships were first held in 2002.

Men's

Champions
1999: Rochester Institute of Technology
2002: Ithaca College
2003: Nazareth College
2004: Nazareth College
2005: Nazareth College
2006: Rochester Institute of Technology
2007: Nazareth College
2008: Ithaca College
2009: Nazareth College
2010: Rochester Institute of Technology

Player of the Year
1999: Ben Hunt (RIT)
2000: Jake Coon (Nazareth)
2001: Eric Goodberlet (Nazareth)
2002: Ryan Martin (Ithaca)
2003: Matt Kent (Nazareth)
2004: Josh Molinari (RIT)
2005: Matt Casey (Ithaca)
2006: David Thering (RIT)
2007: Ryan Hotaling (Nazareth)
2008: Matt Nelligan (Ithaca)
2010: Mark DeCirce (Nazareth), Jordan MacIntosh (RIT)

Goalkeeper of the Year
2007: Dennis Butler (Ithaca)
2008: Dave Decker (Stevens)
2010: David Gal (Ithaca)

Rookie of the Year
1996: Ben Hunt (RIT)
2000: Dennis Juleff (Ithaca)
2001: Mark Colite (Hartwick)
2002: Brian Weil (Ithaca)
2003: Dave Thering (RIT)
2004: Dennis Butler (Ithaca), Andy German (Alfred)
2005: Andrew Ruocco (RIT)
2006: Mike Cintineo (Ithaca)
2007: Erinn O'Hara (Nazareth)
2008: Vito DeMola (Hartwick)
2010: Harry Hughes (Hartwick)

Coach of the Year
2000: Scott Nelson (Nazareth), Ken Long (Ithaca), Bart Governanti (Elmira)
2001: Rob Randall (Nazareth)
2002: Jeff Long (Ithaca)
2003: Rob Randall (Nazareth)
2004: Gene Peluso (RIT)
2005: Jeff Long (Ithaca)
2006: Jeff Long (Ithaca)
2007: Rob Randall (Nazareth)
2008: Jeff Long (Ithaca)
2010: Jake Coon (RIT)

Women's

Champions
2002: Nazareth College
2003: Ithaca College
2004: Ithaca College
2005: Nazareth College
2006: Nazareth College
2007: St. John Fisher College
2008: Ithaca College
2009: St. John Fisher College

Player of the Year
2000: Lauren D'Aurio (Alfred), Maya Lambiase (Nazareth)
2001: Brooke Andrews (Ithaca)
2002: Allison Roberts (Nazareth)
2003: Jessica Welch (Ithaca), Shawna Kabot (Nazareth)
2004: Michelle Schlegel (Ithaca)
2005: Katya Outwater (Elmira)
2006: Betsy Carney (Nazareth)
2007: Laurie Quackenbush (St. John Fisher)
2008: Laurie Quackenbush (St. John Fisher)

Goalkeeper of the Year
2007: Kelsey Evans (RIT)
2008: Kelsey Evans (RIT)

Rookie of the Year
2000: Lorra Podsiadlo (Nazareth)
2001: Michelle Schlegel (Ithaca)
2002: Lindsay Gotham (Nazareth)
2003: Kurstin Meehan (Ithaca)
2004: Theresa Nobilski (St. John Fisher)
2005: Meagan Howell (Ithaca)
2006: Jen Springett (St. John Fisher)
2007: Lauren Glavin (St. John Fisher)
2008: Tammy Kohanski (Utica)

Coach of the Year
2000: Sue Behme (Nazareth)
2001: Piep van Heuven (Ithaca)
2002: Sue Behme (Nazareth)
2003: Karen Hollands (Ithaca)
2004: Karen Hollands (Ithaca)
2005: Sue Behme (Nazareth)
2006: Sue Behme (Nazareth)
2007: Shannon McHale (St. John Fisher)
2008: Sue Behme (Nazareth)

Swimming & diving
The men's and women's swimming & diving championships were first held in 2002.

Men's

Champions
2002: Ithaca College
2003: Alfred University
2004: Ithaca College
2005: Alfred University
2006: Hartwick College
2007: Alfred University
2008: Alfred University
2009: Alfred University
2010: Stevens Institute of Technology
2011: Ithaca College
2012: Ithaca College
2013: Stevens Institute of Technology
2014: Stevens Institute of Technology
2015: Stevens Institute of Technology
2016: Stevens Institute of Technology

Athlete of the Meet
2002: Sean Kavanaugh (Ithaca)
2003: Erik Zelbacher (RIT)
2004: Sean Kavanaugh (Ithaca), Sasha Kuznezov (Ithaca)
2005: Erik Zelbacher (RIT)
2006: Erik Zelbacher (RIT)
2007: Matt Baker (Alfred)
2008: Brian Agro (Alfred)
2009: Evan Wilson (Stevens)
2010: Andrew Brisson (Alfred)
2011: Dan Pecoraro (Stevens)
2012: Michael Phillips (Hartwick)
2013: John Hu (Stevens)
2014: Joshua Lefeber (Stevens)
2015: Joshua Lefeber (Stevens), Miles Blaney (Hartwick)
2016: Joshua Lefeber (Stevens), Matt Plunkett (Hartwick)

Athlete of the Year
2002: Sean Kavanaugh (Ithaca)
2003: Erik Zelbacher (RIT)
2004: Sean Kavanaugh (Ithaca), Sasha Kuznezov (Ithaca)
2005: Erik Zelbacher (RIT)
2006: Erik Zelbacher (RIT)
2007: 
2008: Matt Baker (Alfred)
2009: Matt Baker (Alfred)
2010: Evan Wilson (Stevens)
2011: John Hu (Stevens)
2012: Alex Benham (Stevens)
2013: John Hu (Stevens)
2014: Adam Zelehowsky (Ithaca)
2015: Miles Blaney (Hartwick)
2016: Ravi Sun (Stevens)

Rookie of the Meet
2002: Steve Barnes (Ithaca)
2003: Brian Gotham (Alfred)
2004: Kurt Cedo (Hartwick)
2005: Quinn Donahoe (RIT)
2006: Kevin Milkovich (Hartwick)
2007: Andrew Brisson (Alfred)
2008: Joe Gage (Ithaca), Evan Wilson (Stevens)
2009: Antoine Conners (Ithaca)
2010: John Hu (Stevens)
2011: Taylor Van Cott (Ithaca)
2012: Miles Blaney (Hartwick)
2013: 
2014: 
2015: 
2016: Vinny Tavoletti (Stevens)

Coach of the Year
2002: Kevin Markwardt (Ithaca)
2003: Brian Striker (Alfred)
2004: Kevin Markwardt (Ithaca)
2005: Brian Striker (Alfred)
2006: Dale Rothenberger (Hartwick)
2007: Brian Striker (Alfred)
2008: Brian Striker (Alfred)
2009: Brian Striker (Alfred)
2010: Trevor Miele (Stevens)
2011: Kevin Markwardt (Ithaca)
2012: Kevin Markwardt (Ithaca)
2013: Stevens Institute of Technology
2014: Kevin Markwardt (Ithaca)
2015: Stevens Institute of Technology
2016: Stevens Institute of Technology

Women's

Champions
2002: Ithaca College
2003: Ithaca College
2004: Ithaca College
2005: Ithaca College
2006: Ithaca College
2007: Ithaca College
2008: Ithaca College

Athlete of the meet
2002: Lisa Elsemore (Nazareth)
2003: Megan Hughes (Ithaca)
2004: Megan Hughes (Ithaca), Gayle Gregory (Hartwick)
2005: Aubrey Kirchoff (Nazareth)
2006: Emily Lesher (Nazareth)

Swimmer of the meet
2007: Emily Lesher (Nazareth)
2008: Emily Lesher (Nazareth)

Diver of the meet
2007: Erin Collins (Alfred)
2008: Ashley Brinkman (Hartwick)

Rookie of the meet
2002: Daniel Moreau (Hartwick)
2003: Stacey Bowen (Ithaca)
2004: Mary Larkin (Hartwick)
2005: Emily Lesher (Nazareth)
2006: Lauren Botterbusch (Ithaca)
2007: Caitlyn Burr (RIT)
2008: Sheila Rhoades (Ithaca)

Coach of the year
2002: TJ Davis (Alfred)
2003: Paula Miller (Ithaca)
2004: Dale Rothenberger (Hartwick)
2005: Martie Staser (Nazareth)
2006: Paula Miller (Ithaca)
2007: Martie Staser (Nazareth)
2008: Paula Miller (Ithaca)

Tennis
Alfred University, Elmira College, Hartwick College, Ithaca College, Nazareth College, Rochester Institute of Technology, St. John Fisher College, Stevens Institute of Technology, and Utica College compete in Empire 8 tennis. The men's and women's tennis championships were first held in 2002.

Men's

Champions
2002: Rochester Institute of Technology
2003: Ithaca College
2004: Ithaca College
2005: Rochester Institute of Technology
2006: Ithaca College
2007: Ithaca College
2008: Stevens Institute of Technology
2009: Ithaca College
2010: Stevens Institute of Technology

Player of the Year
2002: Michael Magnone (Nazareth)
2003: Scott Rubens (Ithaca)
2004: Vladimir Vecher (Hartwick)
2005: David Chachu (RIT)
2006: Chris Ciolino (Ithaca)
2007: Colin Flynn (Ithaca)

Rookie of the Year
2002: David Chachu (RIT)
2003: Chris Ciolino (Ithaca)
2004: Colin Flynn (Ithaca)
2005: Aaron Haak (St. John Fisher)
2006: Ryan Weaver (Nazareth)
2007: Taylor Borda (Ithaca)

Coach of the Year
2002: Ann Nealon (RIT)
2003: Bill Austin (Ithaca)
2004: Andrea Pontius (Hartwick)
2005: Ann Nealon (RIT)
2006: Bill Austin (Ithaca)
2007: Bill Austin (Ithaca)

Women's

Champions
2002: Nazareth College
2003: Nazareth College
2004: Ithaca College
2005: Alfred University
2006: Ithaca College
2007: Ithaca College

Player of the Year
2001: Katie Silky (Nazareth)
2002: Sara Kula (RIT)
2003: Alicia Ballard (Alfred)
2004: Alicia Ballard (Alfred)
2005: Caitlin Castle (Ithaca)
2006: Katie Calfee (Alfred)
2007: Dana Bacalla (Stevens)

Rookie of the Year
2001: Alicia Ballard (Alfred)
2002: Jennifer Hume (RIT)
2003: Jody Butterfoss (Alfred)
2004: Katie Calfee (Alfred)
2005: Caitlin Castle (Ithaca)
2006: Caroline Caillet (RIT)
2007: Melanie Cohen (Ithaca)

Coach of the Year
2001: Brian Friedland (Alfred)
2002: Linda Gohagan (St. John Fisher)
2003: Annette Shapiro (Nazareth)
2004: Brian Friedland (Alfred)
2005: Bill Austin (Ithaca)
2006: Bill Austin (Ithaca)
2007: Bill Austin (Ithaca)

Cross country
The men's and women's cross country championships were first held in 2003.

Men's

Champions
2003: Ithaca College
2004: Rochester Institute of Technology
2005: Rochester Institute of Technology
2006: Rochester Institute of Technology
2007: Rochester Institute of Technology

Runner of the Year
2003: Mike Styczynski (Ithaca)
2004: Shawn Calabrese (Ithaca)
2005: Nate Lowe (RIT)
2006: Jesse Williamson (RIT)
2007: Brendan Epstein (Nazareth)

Rookie of the Year
2003: Patrick McGreal (Ithaca)
2004: Brendan Epstein (Nazareth)
2005: Jared Burdick (RIT)
2006: Nick Stenuf (Nazareth)
2007: Mitch Boise (Utica)

Coach of the Year
2003: Jim Nichols (Ithaca)
2004: David Warth (RIT)
2005: David Warth (RIT)
2006: David Warth (RIT)
2007: David Warth (RIT)

Women's

Champions
2003: Ithaca College
2004: Ithaca College
2005: Ithaca College
2006: Ithaca College
2007: Ithaca College

Runner of the Year
2003: Amanda Laytham (Ithaca)
2004: Bridgette Pilling (Ithaca)
2005: Rachel Blasiak (Ithaca)
2006: Rachel Blasiak (Ithaca)
2007: Lindsey Nadolski (Ithaca)

Rookie of the Year
2003: Rachel Blasik (Ithaca)
2004: Adrienne Gagnier (RIT)
2005: Lindsey Nadolski (Ithaca)
2006: McKenzie Clemens (Alfred)
2007: Alissa Kersey (Ithaca)

Coach of the Year
2003: William Ware (Ithaca)
2004: William Ware (Ithaca)
2005: William Ware (Ithaca)
2006: William Ware (Ithaca)
2007: William Ware (Ithaca)

Track

Indoor track
The men's and women's indoor track championships were first held in 2004.

Men's

Champions
2004: Ithaca College
2005: Rochester Institute of Technology
2006: Rochester Institute of Technology
2007: Rochester Institute of Technology
2008: Ithaca College

Athlete of the meet
2004: Kevin Alford (Ithaca), Curtis Howard (RIT)
2005: Matt Bango (RIT)
2006: Nick Stenuf (Nazareth)

Track Athlete of the meet
2007: Nate Lowe (RIT)
2008: Nick Stenuf (Nazareth)
2009: Michael Hardbarger AKA Ginnie (RIT)

Field Athlete of the meet
2007: Ryan Squillacioti (Alfred), Brandon Wheeler (Nazareth)
2008: Ryan Squillacioti (Alfred)

Rookie of the meet
2004: David Falcinelli (RIT)
2005: Jimmy Sorel (RIT)
2006: Jared Burdick (RIT), P.J. Scott (Ithaca)
2007: Dennis Akey (Ithaca)
2008: Jeff Wetmore (Ithaca)

Coach of the year
2004: Jim Nichols (Ithaca)
2005: David Warth (RIT)
2006: David Warth (RIT)
2007: David Warth (RIT)
2008: Jim Nichols (Ithaca)

Women's

Champions
2004: Ithaca College
2005: Ithaca College
2006: Ithaca College
2007: Rochester Institute of Technology
2008:

Athlete of the meet
2004: Amanda Laytham (Ithaca), Sheri Kelleher (Hartwick)
2005: Danielle Simmons (RIT)
2006: LaKeisha Perez (RIT)

Track Athlete of the meet
2007: LaKeisha Perez (RIT)
2008:

Field Athlete of the meet
2007: Jamie Morey (RIT)
2008:

Rookie of the meet
2004: Jessemyn Russell (Nazareth)
2005: LaKeisha Perez (RIT)
2006: Elizabeth Wilcox (Ithaca)
2007: Marcia McCord (Ithaca)
2008:

Coach of the year
2004: Jennifer Potter (Ithaca)
2005: Jennifer Potter (Ithaca)
2006: Jennifer Potter (Ithaca)

Outdoor track
The men's and women's outdoor track championships were first held in 2004.

Men's

Champions
2004: Ithaca College
2005: Ithaca College
2006: Rochester Institute of Technology

Athlete of the Meet
2004: Mike Styczynski (Ithaca), Tariq Ahmad (Ithaca)
2005: Jimmy Sorel (RIT)
2006: Nick Stenuf (Nazareth)

Rookie of the Meet
2004: Ken Taylor (Nazareth)
2005: Matt Bango (RIT)
2006: Drew Hodge (Ithaca)

Coach of the Year
2004: Jim Nichols (Ithaca)
2005: Jim Nichols (Ithaca)
2006: David Warth (RIT)

Women's

Champions
2004: Ithaca College
2005: Ithaca College
2006: Ithaca College

Athlete of the Meet
2004: Sheri Kelleher (Hartwick), Allison Griggs (RIT)
2005: Elena DeQuesada (Ithaca)
2006: Lauren Koppel (Ithaca), LaKeisha Perez (RIT)

Rookie of the Meet
2004: Stephanie Matuszewski (RIT)
2005: LaKeisha Perez (RIT)
2006: Lauren Koppel (Ithaca)

Coach of the Year
2004: Jennifer Potter (Ithaca)
2005: Jennifer Potter (Ithaca)
2006: Jennifer Potter (Ithaca)

References

External links